Paranormal Activity 2 is a 2010 American found footage supernatural horror film directed by Tod Williams and written by  Michael R. Perry, Christopher Landon and Tom Pabst. The film is a prequel to the 2007 film Paranormal Activity, beginning two months before and following up with the events depicted in the original film. It was released in theaters at midnight on October 22, 2010 in the United States, the United Kingdom, Canada, Mexico, Brazil, Argentina, Poland and Ireland.
An unrated version of the film was also released.

Plot

In August 2006, a "burglary" occurs at the home of Kristi (Sprague Grayden) and Daniel Rey (Brian Boland), trashing their house and leaving only their infant son Hunter's bedroom untouched. The only thing stolen is a necklace that Kristi's sister, Katie, gave to her. Martine, the Latin American family housekeeper and nanny, senses "evil spirits" in the house and burns sage to rid the house of them, and Daniel fires her for doing so. Kristi also believes that their home is haunted, and she and Katie talk about being tormented by a demon when they were children. Daniel, however, initially dismisses her claim despite footage of strange occurrences around the house. Daniel's daughter from a prior marriage, Ali (Molly Ephraim), begins investigating the mysterious happenings; she discovers that humans can make deals with demons for wealth or power by forfeiting the soul of their first-born son, but if the deal is not fulfilled, the demon will stick to the family until another son is born—Hunter was the first male to be born on Kristi's side since the 1930s.
 
The violence escalates, as the family's German shepherd, Abby, is attacked by the demon and apparently suffers from a seizure. As Daniel and Ali take Abby to the veterinarian, Kristi is attacked and dragged into the basement by the demon, possessing her. The following day, Ali is left home with Kristi, unaware she is possessed. Soon, Ali hears a scratch sound in the basement door and opens it to find scratches and sees a word, meus (Latin for "Mine"), etched into it. A strange bite mark on her leg and the footage of Kristi’s attack motivates Daniel to re-hire Martine, who prepares a cross to exorcise the demon; Kristi will have no memory of having been possessed. Daniel goes to pass the demon onto Katie so that Kristi and Hunter will be saved, despite Ali's pleas not to.

That night, when Daniel tries to use the cross on Kristi, she attacks him and the houselights all go out. Using the handheld camera's night vision, he walks around the shaking house into the basement where he is attacked by Kristi; he retaliates against her with the cross, causing her to collapse. Daniel puts Kristi to bed and burns a photo of a young Katie, passing the demon onto her. Three weeks later, Katie visits and explains that strange things have begun happening at her house. On October 9, the night after Micah is killed, a possessed and bloodstained Katie breaks into the Rey house, kills Daniel and Kristi and then takes Hunter with her. Ali comes home from a school trip to find the corpses, and Katie and Hunter went missing.

Cast

 Sprague Grayden as Kristi Rey
 Brian Boland as Daniel Rey, Kristi's husband
 Molly Ephraim as Ali Rey, Dan's daughter
 Katie Featherston as Katie, Kristi's older sister 
 Micah Sloat as Micah 
 Seth Ginsberg as Brad, boyfriend of Ali
 Vivis Cortez as Martine, the nanny / housekeeper
 Jackson Xenia Prieto and William Juan Prieto as Hunter Rey, Dan and Kristi's infant son

Production
Paramount and DreamWorks hired screenwriter Michael R. Perry to create Paranormal Activity 2. Oren Peli, the director of the first film, served as a producer for this prequel. Kevin Greutert, director of Saw VI, was initially hired to direct the prequel; however, Lions Gate Entertainment exercised a clause in Greutert's contract to have him direct the final film in the Saw franchise. Other directors considered to replace him before Tod Williams included Brian De Palma, Akiva Goldsman, Brad Anderson, and Greg McLean. Both of the actors from the first film, Katie Featherston and Micah Sloat, reprise their roles in the prequel. Tod Williams directed Paranormal Activity 2, which started production in May 2010 and finished filming in only three weeks.

Marketing
In a special promotion set up by the film's producers, participants had a chance to win a free movie ticket if they were in the top twenty cities to demand the film, via Eventful.com. The teaser trailer was seen with The Twilight Saga: Eclipse upon its release on June 30, 2010. Cinemark pulled the trailer from several Texas theaters after receiving complaints that it was too frightening. In Mexico, it was attached to the 3D version of Resident Evil: Afterlife. A second theatrical trailer was released on October 1, 2010. The trailer was attached to Devil, My Soul to Take and Jackass 3D.

Release
The film was released in the United States on October 22, 2010. The film was made available in IMAX format as well as standard.

Critical reception
On Rotten Tomatoes, the film has an approval rating of 58% based on reviews from 137 critics, with an average rating of 6.10/10. The consensus states that "Paranormal Activity 2 doesn't cover any new ground, but its premise is still scary—and in some respects, it's a better film than the original." On Metacritic, the film has received an weighted average score of 53 out of 100, based on reviews from 23 critics, indicating "mixed or average reviews". Audiences polled by CinemaScore gave it a grade B.

Artistdirect called it "one of the scariest films of all time". Entertainment Weekly said the film "blends [shock and suspense] into what might be called shockpense"; reviewer Owen Gleiberman called it a "shivery-skillful, highly worthy fear-factor sequel" and wrote, "The images all point down, which is subtly disquieting, and each one is composed with enough wide-angle space and distance, and enough nooks and crannies, so that even when nothing is happening, the often dead-silent shots tend to grow scarier the more you look at them... It made me jump, sweat, and chew my fingernails." Roger Ebert, who awarded the original film three and a half stars, awarded Paranormal Activity 2 one-and-a-half out of a possible four.

Box office
Paranormal Activity 2 broke the record for biggest midnight gross for an R-rated film with $6.3 million, beating the previous record-holder Watchmen by $4.6 million, and broke the record for biggest opening for a horror movie of all time. On its opening day, Paranormal Activity 2 placed number one at the box office, making $20,100,000 and finished with a total of $41,500,000 estimated over the weekend, placing first at the box office. It has currently grossed $84,752,907 in North America and $92,759,125 overseas, giving the film a worldwide total of $177,512,032.

Home media
Paranormal Activity 2 was released on DVD/Blu-ray and video on demand/pay-per-view on February 8, 2011, and includes an unrated director's cut and deleted scenes. Paranormal Activity 2 was placed at #1 for top Blu-ray and rental sales for its first week of being out.

The deleted scene from Paranormal Activity 2 titled "Hunter" is available  in Paranormal Activity 2: Unrated Director's Cut.

Sequels

Paranormal Activity 3 is a 2011 American supernatural horror film, directed by Henry Joost and Ariel Schulman. It is the third film of the Paranormal Activity series and serves as a prequel, set 18 years prior to the events of the first two films. It was released in theaters on October 21, 2011.

The fourth installment, Paranormal Activity 4, was released on October 18, 2012 in the United States. It was planned to take place four years after the events of Paranormal Activity 2". Katie and Hunter have reappeared and live in a house across the street from Alex and Wyatt. Alex and her family begin experiencing paranormal events taking place in their own home. "Toby" is mentioned once in the film, said by Ben. Although a box office success, Paranormal Activity 4 was a critical failure.

A fifth film, Paranormal Activity: The Marked Ones and sixth film, Paranormal Activity: The Ghost Dimension, were released in 2014 and 2015 respectively. A seventh film, Paranormal Activity: Next of Kin'', was released in 2021.

See also
 List of ghost films

References

External links

  (Archived)
 
 
 
 

Paranormal Activity (film series)
2010 films
2010 horror films
American supernatural horror films
Demons in film
Films directed by Tod Williams
Films produced by Jason Blum
Films set in 2006
IMAX films
Prequel films
Paramount Pictures films
Blumhouse Productions films
Films with screenplays by Christopher B. Landon
Films set in San Diego
2010s English-language films
2010s American films
American prequel films
Found footage films